Ammoconia aholai is a moth of the family Noctuidae. It is endemic to Cyprus.

The wingspan is 36–44 mm. There is one generation per year with adults on wing in fall.

The larval host plant is unknown. The species probably overwinters as an egg.

References

External links

 Lepiforum.de

Moths described in 1996
Moths of Europe
Xyleninae